The 1958 Italian general election was held in Italy on 25 May 1958. The number of MPs to be elected was calculated upon the population's size for the last time.

Electoral system
Minor changes were made to the electoral law in 1958, creating a system which would remain unchanged until its abrogation in 1993.

The pure party-list proportional representation was definitely adopted for the Chamber of Deputies. Italian provinces were united in 32 constituencies, each electing a group of candidates. At constituency level, seats were divided between open lists using the largest remainder method with Imperiali quota. Remaining votes and seats were transferred at national level, where they were divided using the Hare quota, and automatically distributed to best losers into the local lists.

For the Senate, 237 single-seat constituencies were established, even if the assembly had 9 more members. The candidates needed a landslide victory of two thirds of votes to be elected: only 5 hoping senators reached this goal. All remained votes and seats were grouped in party lists and regional constituencies, where a D'Hondt method was used: inside the lists, candidates with the best percentages were elected.

Historical background
After De Gasperi's retirement in 1953, Fanfani emerged as the anticipated successor, a role confirmed by his appointment as party secretary from 1954–1959. He reorganized and rejuvenated the national party organization of the Christian Democrats after the dependence on the church and the government which had typified the De Gasperi period.

Fanfani's activist and sometimes authoritarian style, as well as his reputation as an economic reformer, ensured that the moderates within the DC, who opposed the state's intrusion into the country's economic life, regarded him with distrust. His indefatigable energy and his passion for efficiency carried him far in politics, but he was rarely able to exploit fully the opportunities that he created. One politician once remarked: "Fanfani has colleagues, associates, acquaintances and subordinates. But I have never heard much about his friends."

Parties and leaders

Results
The election gave similar results of five years before and, consequently, the same problems of political instability of the centrist formula. Christian Democracy was polarized by a fraction which liked more leftist politics, and another one which urged for a rightist route. Party's secretary Amintore Fanfani was in the first field, and called for a dialogue with the Italian Socialist Party, which had frozen its relationships with the Italian Communist Party after the Hungarian Revolution. Fanfani led a year-term government, but the reaction of the conservative fraction gave the power to Antonio Segni, followed by Fernando Tambroni who received a decisive vote of confidence by the neo-fascist Italian Social Movement. The MSI had been banned by any type of political power since its birth under the theory of the Constitutional Arch, which stated that any government or opposition party which had voted the Italian Constitution, had to refuse any relationship with fascist and monarchist forces, seen as anti-constitutional groups. Strikes and revolts causing some casualties erupted through the country, and Tambroni had to resign. Fanfani returned to the premiership, this time with an openly centre-left programme supported by the socialist abstention. The government created the middle school for workers' sons, and the ENEL after the electric energy nationalisation.

Chamber of Deputies

Results by constituency

Senate of the Republic

Results by constituency

Maps

References

1958
General election
Italian general election